Rally North America is a scavenger hunt style (automotive) multi-state road rally event founded in 2009. The Rally North America events have raised over $1,000,000 for charity since its inception in 2009

RNA (Rally North America) was established in 2009 by a group of fans that couldn't attend a different automotive rally. 
Rally North America is a group of around 80 or more road rally teams that gather together at least once a year to raise money for a selected charity. Each year the group picks another charity to support, while enjoying each other's company on America's vast road system. Along the way the group finds spots or Check points and takes pictures of themselves in front of whatever the check-point as proof they had stopped at that location. Awards are given to the teams that best complete or meet the qualifications of the award.

The Goal of any Rally North America event is to raise money for a deserving charity. All money raised by the rally teams goes to that years charity nothing is ever kept by the teams. The event has grown to a level that new teams can only join the RNA if a slot opens up, many of the teams return year after year to help raise money and enjoy the trips.

Founded by: Scott "Thunder Goat" Spielman and Tony "Danger Stang" Intrieri

Awards
 Spirit of the Rally
 Best Costume
 Longest Distance Traveled
 Hard-luck
 Bessed Dressed Car (Best overall decaled car)
 Social Media Award (Those who posted the most about the event on Social Media)

The Concept

Rally North America is a charity based Road rally that sends teams out on a scavenger hunt to find key points along a secret route that only the organizers know.  The teams must navigate with in safe highway speeds to these checkpoints and place themselves in front of the attraction and take a photo as proof they were there.  The teams that arrive first safely without any traffic violations and have the proof of all the checkpoints will place in 1st, 2nd, or 3rd for the day.  Those teams that place are no longer in the running to win another navigational award, but can still have a chance at winning one of the category awards.

The teams are lined up each day by the amount of money they raised for the charity.  Those with the highest amount raised for the years charity will start first, or will be on the "Pole Position" In honor of their team's efforts for the cause.

Rules for Disqualification or Penalty
1. Team receives a ticket from a member of law enforcement
2. A team is witnessed and recorded on video of unsafe actions by another rally team 
3. Exhibits reckless driving on public roads 
4. Exceeds minimum time allowed by organizers

2009 - Rally One
July 10–12, 2009

Rally ONE's starting line was New York Cities Meat District and departed with another popular rally and finished on the beach in Ocean City Maryland. Only 8 teams attended this inaugural rally event. History is that the RNA was born on the last night of the "ONE" over a 30 pack of Busch Light beers.

Inaugural Teams:

Team Bullitt - Jeff & Gail Rushing

Team BMW - Dan Carpenter & Matt Bercik

Team Danger - Tony Intrieri & Aaron Johnson

Team GTO Scott Spielman & Team Die Hard's wives (We'll never tell)

Team Pontiac -Trevor Walmer

Team RX8 - Mike Schlee & Little Matthew

Team SuperCoupe - Chris Landis

Team VW Jetta - Andrew Preston

2010 - Route 66 2010
May 19–22, 2010

Route 66 was the first official road rally organized by Rally North America, and it was the first of its kind as well, hosting two starting cities Fontana California and Joliet Illinois with a common rally point at the Big Texan in Amarillo Texas.  All in all there were 60 teams that participated in the event.

Charity: Stefanie Spielman Fund for Breast Cancer Research

Rally Award Winners-

Spirit of the Rally:  Team Tuna

Long Distance Award: Team Mini

Hard Luck Award: Team Breakdown

Route 66 2010 (EAST)

Day 1 winner - Slo-pala Kevin & Brad

Day 2 winner - Jeff Hutt

Day 3 winner - Team Benz Doc & Andy

Overall - Team Benz Doc & Andy

Route 66 2010 (West)

Day One winners   - Team Breakdown Casar & Haley

Day Two winners   - Team SRT Daniel Conen

Day Three winners - Team TNT Theresa & Stephenie

Overall - Team TNT Theresa & Stephanie

2011 - Rally Appalachia
July 18–21, 2011

Charity: Intrepid Fallen Heroes Fund Amount raised $17,400

Rally Award Winners-

Spirit of the Rally: Ray Burke & Brian Achey (Team Incognito)

Long Distance Award: JohnnyB (Team Handsome)

Hard Luck Award: Nick and Shelby Loth (Team Nightmare)

Best Costume Award: Troy Krich (Team Cream)

Day One Winners -
1. Team CJ Pony Parts
2. Team .38 Caliber
3. Team EFF Yeah

Day Two Winners -
1. Team Mercedes 
2. Team Barnett Motorsports
3. Team Z51 & Team ITG (TIE)

Day Three Winners -
1. Team LB Racing
2. Team CCGTO Yellow
3. Team Swiper

2012 - Rally Dixie
June 18–21, 2012

Starting in the Downtown location of Nobelsville Indiana, 80 cars rallied for the Accelerated Cure Project For Multiple Sclerosis.  The rally made stops at the Corvette Museum in Bowling Green Kentucky, The Goodyear Plant in Gadsden Alabama, and finished on the beach at Fort Walton Beach Florida.

Teams were welcomed on the World-famous Talladega Super Speedway in Talladega Alabama on the second day.

Rally organizers Scott Spielman and Tony Intrieri were named Champions by the Accelerated Cure Project.  This was the largest 3rd party event in the history of the Project.

Charity: Accelerated Cure Project for MS $68,000 Raised

Rally Awards Winners

Spirit of the Rally: Brian Shannon (Team Die Hard)
 
Long Distance Award: Team G60

Hard Luck Award: Team Fire Chicken

Best Costume Award: Troy Krich and Pals (Team Cream) Car- Police Cruiser Honorable Mention - Jeff & Gail Rushing (Team Raptor)

Day One winners - 1st - Team Bacon B8, 2nd - Team Angry Goat (Team Mojo finished 2nd but received a ticket, hence DQ'd), 3rd - name not mentioned in video

Day Two winners - 1st Team Mega Force, 2nd - Team Eff Yeah!, 3rd - Team LS One / Topgun

Day Three winners - 1st Team TDI, 2nd Team Hopps, 3rd - Matt Bercik, Dan Carpenter, Aaron Johnson, Jon Bowen (Team Most Impressive)

2012 - Rocky Mountain Rally
August 19–22, 2012

The Rocky Mountain Rally an additional event hosted by RNA Associates in Colorado.  It consisted of 40 cars that navigated some of the most beautiful areas the US has to offer.  The Routes took them from Colorado Springs, CO to Las Vegas, NV.

Charity: Accelerated Cure Project for MS (See Rally Dixie for charity totals (two events combined funds))

Rally Award Winners-

DAY 1:
1st - Team Damn the torpedoes #303
2nd - Team McCharger #949
3rd - Team Romp It #86

DAY 2:
1st - Team Black SS #12
2nd - Team Left Lane Bredren #420
3rd - Team Stig #21

DAY 3:
1st - Team Toy Car Racers #731
2nd - Team TnT #777
3rd - Team F-Body #11

Hard Luck - Team RSI Motorsports # 37

Best costume - Team PugZ #23

Long distance - Team Canada #43

Spirit of the rally - Team Blue Car #672

Honorable Mentions for the Spirit Award to Paul Gillespie & Marv!

2013 - Rally New England / CJ Pony Parts
July 21–23, 2013

Charity: Camp Sunshine $90,571 Raised

Rally New England started in Ithaca New York on July 22, 2013 and included laps on the famed Watkins Glen International raceway.  The rally officially started on 22 July in the Ithaca Commons area and consisted of 78 teams. They departed downtown and headed to various checkpoints throughout Up-State New York onto day 1 destination in Rutland, Vermont. From Rutland, Vermont the teams rallied to Camp Sunshine where they were met with the children and staff from Camp Sunshine which was the benefactor of the event.  After the visit at Camp Sunshine the teams settled into Auburn Maine.  Day 3 consisted of light houses and coastal highways on the final destination into Saint John, New Brunswick, Canada.

 This was the first multi-national event hosted by Rally North America.

Rally Award Winners-

Spirit of the Rally - Ernie Clements (Team Red Beard) Car-GTO HONORABLE MENTION: Aaron Johnson (Team Solo)

Best Costume - Troy Krich, Frank Figgs (Team Cream) Car-Jeep HONORABLE MENTION: Gail & Jeff Rushing (Team .38 Caliber)

Hard-Luck - Michaela & Kyle Watson (Team RV There yet?!) Car-BMW

Longest Trip - Aaron Johnson (Team Solo) Car-2013 Fender Beetle

Day One winners   - 1 Team Rental
2 Angry Underdogs
3 Team CJ Pony Parts

Day Two winners   - 1 Team Bio
2 Team Swiper
3 Team .38 Caliber

Day Three winners - 1 Team LB Racing
2 Team Chaser
3 Team Tallahassee

2013 - Ohio Valley 700
October 4–6, 2013

Charity: Western Ohio Epilepsy Foundation $13,000.00

A 2-day rally event that traveled through the Southern Ohio area and Northern Kentucky state roads. The final stop, The French Lick hotel and Casino Resort. The RNA event only accepted 38 Teams for this run in honor of Cody Converse who died in 2013 from a form of Epilepsy known as SUDEP.

Day 1 route entailed several checkpoints, Source 1 Automotive, Loveland Castle, Grant's boyhood home, Optional Time bonus of the Jenny Ann Ferry, Roh's Opera House, Buffalo Trace Distillery, as well as the 2nd capital building in Indiana.

Day 2 route consisted of Patton Tank Museum at Ft. Knox, Louisville Slugger Museum, Clifty Falls, and Competition Racing in Lawrenceburg Indiana, prior to Finishing back at The Greene.

Rally Awards Winners
 
Best costume - Team Clownin
 
Hard Luck Award - Team ScootScoot
 
Longest Distance - Team PugZ
 
Spirit of the Rally - Team Source 1 Automotive.

Day 1 Winners 1.Team Angry Goat 66 2.Team TDI 78 3.Team Topless/Dermal Addiction 331

Day 2 Winners 1.Team Carwash 1310 2.Team Danger 3.Team 427

2014 - US Route 50 Rally

Rally North America hosted its 5th Anniversary rally on US Route 50.  The field contained 83 teams driving anything from minivans to high performance Hennessy Powered CTS-V's.

The route stuck mainly to highway 50 and started downtown historic Martinsburg West Virginia.  Layover cities included Athens Ohio, Bedford Indiana, Jefferson City Missouri, Dodge City Kansas, and the final destination was Pueblo Colorado.  This was the first time in history that Rally North America offered a 5-day road rally.The benefactor for the rally was the Accelerated Cure Project for Multiple Sclerosis, in which the teams and Rally North America raised over $110,000 for the charity, again a 1st in Rally North America history where they raised over $100,000 in one single event.Rally organizers Tony Intrieri and Scott Spielman received the "Presidents" award from the Accelerated Cure Project for their fundraising efforts for the organization.

The rally was also filmed by Matt Farah and his team from The Smoking Tire and can be viewed on YouTube.

Rally Award winners
Spirit of the Rally Team Raptor
Jeff and Gail Rushing

Hard Luck - Team Blue Car
Mike and Caleb Pedrick

Best Dressed Car - Team Champaign
Mike Karwath & Dan Kinzie

Long Distance Award - Team Rental
Jon King and Nick Hilton

Best Costume - Team GF1  - Barack OBubba 
Jason Marlow

Day 1 -- 
1st. Team Angry Goat
2nd Team Champaign 
3rd. Team Tots

Day 2-- 
1st. Team World Shakers
2nd. Team CJ Pony Parts
3rd. Team FYC and Team N.W.L.B

Day 3--
1st. Team Danger Zone
2nd. Team Geff the Chef
3rd. Team LeadCo

Day 4--
1st. Inglorious Bastards
2nd. Team Rental 
3rd. Team Mob Theory

Day 5-- 
1st. Team Blue Steel
2nd. Team CCGTO Silver
3rd. Team PugZ

Road & Track Magazine Named Rally North America as one of the best Road Rally Events in the world for 2014.

2014 - Ohio Valley 700 Rally

The Second annual Ohio Valley 700 benefiting the Epilepsy Foundation of Western Ohio was held on October 11 through the 13th and primarily consisted of a route that snaked through the back roads of southern Ohio on through central West Virginia. 51 participants raised a total of $26,685.

The funds will be used by the Epilepsy Foundation of Western Ohio to support the awareness for SUDEP and other Epilepsy programs they operate.

Day 1 consisted of a starting line held on Monument street in downtown Dayton Ohio. Some of the highlight checkpoints were the floodwalls located in Portsmouth Ohio, Hillbilliy Hotdogs in Lesage WV.  The Mothman Statue and Museum in Point Pleasant WV, and the Trans-Allegheny Lunatic Asylum.  The overall route for the first day was about 350 miles.  The destination city for the first day was Buckhannon, West Virginia.

Day 2 was a lot of the same type of roads, the Rally Teams departed from Jawbone Park in central Buckhannon and made their way to find the 8 checkpoints, which consisted of Waters state park, Old Stone house museum, and a run through Hocking Hills Ohio.  The final destination was at the Epilepsy Foundation of Western Ohio.

Rally Award Winners:
Spirit of the Rally Team CCGTO Silver
Bart Rowley

Hard Luck - Team Still Chillin'
Robert Blanton

Best Dressed Car - Team Dermal Addiction (Minions)
Greg and Kim Rada

Long Distance Award - Team PugZ
Diana Inberg

Best Costume - Community Chest - 
Jeff & Gail Rushing and Mike and Rob Schlee
Honorable Mentions:
Team Champagne Deciples
Team Cream

Social Media Award - Team Champagne
Mike Karwath - Dan Kinzie

Day 1 -- 
1st. Team Luxury
2nd. Team Danger Zone
3rd. Team Autobahn Polezi

Day 2-- 
1st. Team Toasted
2nd. Team Goat Busters
3rd. Team Impr335ive

 2015 Smoky Mountain Rally 
 
__

The Sixth annual summer rally was named The Smoky Mountain Rally benefiting Hope For The Warriors was held during the second week of July 2015. The route that snaked through the Smoky Mountains of Tennessee and North Carolina traveled through Georgia finishing in Savannah. 160 participants raised a total of $121,505.

Day 1 consisted of a starting line held on Clinch Street Bridge in downtown Knoxville, Tennessee. Weather played a role as massive thunderstorms followed the teams across the Cherohala Skyway Some of the highlights were numerous overlooks and waterfalls as well as the Junaluska Memorial located in Robbinsville North Carolina.

Day 2 was a lot of the same type of roads, the Rally Teams departed from Jawbone Park in central Buckhannon and made their way to find the 8 checkpoints, which consisted of Waters state park, Old Stone house museum, and a run through Hocking Hills Ohio.  The final destination was at the Epilepsy Foundation of Western Ohio.

Rally Award Winners:

Spirit of the Rally -Bill Tumas and Gordon Wagner. Team CJ Pony Parts

Hard Luck - Team Schoolhaus

Best Dressed Car - Dan Carpenter

Long Distance Award - Team Rental

Best Costume - Team Champagne, FedEx Theme

Social Media Award - Dan Tyger

Day 1 -- 
1st. Team Danger Zone
2nd. Team Black Ops (Team Angry Goat)
3rd. Team Mountaineer

Day 2-- 
1st. Team Challenger
2nd. Team Turnin Concepts
3rd. Team Hopps

Day 3--
1st.  Team CJ Pony Parts
2nd.  Team Tallahassee
3rd.  Team World Shakers

 2015 Ohio Valley 700 
 
__
$30,000.00. (Which puts rallynorthamerica for $154,000 for 2015)

Just wanted to thank all that were involved in making this event a success!! All the new teams were awesome!!! Great meeting so many new folks, and welcoming them into the RNA Family.

  Day 1 
1st Team Rental

2nd Team DuHast

3rd Team Genesis

    Day 2 
1st Team Dermal Addiction

2nd Team Madramper

3rd Team HarperZCategory AwardsLong DistanceTeam Mardi GrasBest CostumeTeam Al DerpinsBest CarTeam AngelHard LuckBrian GoodmanSpirit of the RallyChris Harper

 2016 Big Sky Rally 

Schedule & Route Overview

Rally Day 1: Billings, Montana to Big Sky, Montana
Rally Day 2: Big Sky, Montana to Great Falls, Montana

Rally Day 3: Great Falls, Montana to Kellogg, Idaho

Rally Day 4: Kellogg, Idaho to Kennewick, Washington

Rally Day 5: Kennewick, Washington to Portland, Oregon

 2016 Ohio Valley 700 
Schedule & Route Overview

Rally Day 1: Hershey, PA to Deep Creek, MD

Rally Day 2: Deep Creek, MD to Show Shoe, WV

Rally Day 3: Show Shoe, WV to Athens, OH
__

 2017 Rally Appalachia II 

 2018 Rt-50 Rally West 
 Total Amount Raised $217133 for Cops 2018 __Day 1 Team Total Points1st TAG 4790

2nd RAWRR 4425

3rd SUNSHINE 3390Day 21st 2/10THS FASTER 3260

2nd NW GEARHEAD 3240

3rd SEVEN - 11 3100Day 31st WORLD SHAKERS 3445

2nd PRINCE 3395

3rd SUBARU 3275Day 41st Gaudzilla 6380

2nd Drive Shop 6185

3rd Team Stressed Out!/Team Eddie 6075Spirit of the Rally Team RAWRRBest Costume Team 38 CaliberBest Car Team ChillinLongest Distance Team DisgruntledHard Luck Award Team Badillac

 2018 Blue Ridge Rally 
2018 Blue Ridge Rally was held 12–14 October 2018 with the beneficiary again going with the organization Concerns of Police Survivors.  The route started in Parkersburg West Virginia and the teams stayed at the Historic Blennerhasset Hotel.  The rally kicked off at 8:30 AM and went through the back roads of WV and visited some key checkpoints along the way.  Day 1 ended in Snowshoe Resort in Snowshoe WV.  Day 2 kicked off with a snow storm on top of the mountain while teams made their way to the New River Gorge Bridge for the first checkpoint.  For the first time in 8 years there was measurable snow accumulation for a rally start.   Day 3 found the teams in Norton VA and the last leg into the final city of Helen GA.  Below are the results of the event.

__Day 1 results1st Team Mistaken Identity 3330
2nd Team Mountaineer 3160
3rd Team Parallel 3020Day 2 results1: Team Trouble 3075
2: Team Davis 2650
3: Team Beer Run 2574Day 3 Results 
1: Team Swerve and Protect
2: Team LEO
3: Team DermalCategory Awards:Best Costume: Team RamRodHard Luck: TeamGTOLong Distance: TeamRawrrrBest Dressed Car: Team MadRamperSpirit of the Rally:''' Greg Rada/Kim Rada Team Dermal

References

External links

 Camp Sunshine Rally Event Pictures
 Rally North America About
 Rally North America
 darlingtonraceway.com
 citizen-times.com
 thesmokingtire.com
 carsandparts.com
 pennlive.com
 currentnoblesville.com
 ldnews.com
 gadsdentimes.com
 myfoxal.com
 social.ford.com
 ithaca.com
 sunjournal.com
 ithacajournal.com
 hooniverse.com
 whcuradio.com
 newenglandracingnews.com
 wabi.tv
 cbc.ca
 ov700.kintera.org

Road rallying